Hector Gordon Jelf  (6 May 1917 – 11 December 1997) was an English first-class cricketer and British colonial official in Africa.

The son of Sir Arthur Selbourne Jelf, he was born at Putney in May 1917. He was educated at Marlborough College, before going up to Exeter College, Oxford. While studying at Oxford, he played first-class cricket for Oxford University in 1938, making two appearances against Yorkshire and a combined Minor Counties team. Playing as a wicket-keeper, he scored 48 runs, took five catches and made a single stumping. 

After graduating from Oxford, he served in the Colonial Service in British West Africa. In the Second World War he was an emergency commission as a second lieutenant in the African Colonial Force in the first month of the war. Jelf resumed his duties in the Colonial Service after the war, holding a number of positions within the Nigerian colonial government, eventually rising to become the permanent secretary to the ministry of education from 1959–64. He was made a CBE in the 1962 New Year Honours. Jelf died in England at St Leonards-on-Sea in December 1997.

References

External links

1917 births
1997 deaths
People from Putney
People educated at Marlborough College
Alumni of Exeter College, Oxford
English cricketers
Oxford University cricketers
English civil servants
British Army personnel of World War II
Commanders of the Order of the British Empire